Eubranchus tanzanensis is a species of sea slug or nudibranch, a marine gastropod mollusc in the family Eubranchidae.

Distribution
This species was described from two animals found amongst roots of eelgrass (Cymodocea sp.) at Ladder Cove, Dar es Salaam, Tanzania.

References

Eubranchidae
Gastropods described in 1969